The tall-stem thermometers are a kind of thermometer, resting on branched feet.

The stems carry enamel buttons indicating the degrees of one of the thermometric scales used by the Accademia del Cimento in Florence. The black buttons indicate single degrees, the white buttons ten degrees, and the blue buttons one hundred degrees. The thermometric liquid is acquarzente.

Bibliography

External links 

Thermometers